African Americans and Jewish Americans have interacted throughout much of the history of the United States. This relationship has included widely publicized cooperation and conflict, and—since the 1970s—it has been an area of significant academic research. Cooperation during the Civil Rights Movement was strategic and significant, culminating in the Civil Rights Act of 1964.

The relationship has also featured conflicts and controversies which are related to such topics as the Black Power movement, Zionism, affirmative action, and the antisemitic trope concerning the alleged dominant role of American and Caribbean-based Jews in the Atlantic slave trade.

Background
During the colonial era, Jewish immigrants to the Thirteen Colonies were generally merchants from London. They settled in cities such as Providence, Rhode Island, Charleston, South Carolina, and Savannah, Georgia, gradually integrating into the local society. Some Jews became slaveholders, which was a long-established institution in the colonies. American historian Eli Faber says that "[t]he numbers just aren't there to support the view", and that "Jews were involved, but to an insignificant degree. That doesn't absolve them of that guilt, but everyone made money off African slaves: Arabs, Europeans, Africans." Like many Christians of the time, some Jews used the Bible to justify the enslavement of Black people. For instance, a Jewish editor named Jacob N. Cardozo explained that "the reason the Almighty had made the colored black" was to mark him as inferior, providing an obvious, God-given approval of slavery. For the most part, American Jews did not accept a sense of responsibility for the larger society around them until the late 19th century. When they finally did so, Southern Jews lagged far behind Northern Jews.

In the late 19th and early 20th centuries, millions of Ashkenazi Jews from Eastern Europe immigrated to the U.S. for social and economic opportunities due to widespread pogroms in their homelands. They mainly settled in cities across the Northeast and Midwest, such as New York City, Boston, Chicago, Cleveland, Detroit, and Philadelphia, where manufacturing industries were in dire need of workers. Jewish immigrants entered northeastern and midwestern cities in the same period when Black people were migrating in the hundreds of thousands from the rural South in the Great Migration; Jewish and Black people had a greater variety of encounters, and these were markedly different in urban Northern centers and agricultural Southern areas. It was around this time that Northern Jews began to express massive sympathy for the plight of Black Americans:

In the early 1900s, Northern Jewish daily and weekly publications frequently reported on violence against Blacks, and often compared the anti-Black violence in the South to the deadly anti-Jewish pogroms in the Russian Empire. They were inspired by principles of justice and by a desire to change racist policies in the United States. During this period, Northern Jewish leaders invested their time, influence and economic resources into Black endeavors, supporting civil rights, philanthropy, social service, and organizing. Historian Hasia Diner notes that "they made sure that their actions were well publicized" as part of an effort to demonstrate increasing Jewish political clout.

Julius Rosenwald was a Northern Jewish philanthropist who donated a large part of his fortune to supporting Black education in the South by providing matching funds for construction of schools in rural areas. Northern Jews played a major role in the National Association for the Advancement of Colored People (NAACP) in its early decades. Northern Jews involved in the NAACP included Joel Elias Spingarn (the first chairman), Arthur B. Spingarn, and founder Henry Moskowitz. More recently, Jack Greenberg was a leader in the organization.

In the South, however, any pro-Black attitudes amongst Jews in this time period would have provoked fierce opposition from Christian White Southerners. Southern Jewish attitudes towards Blacks only started to change in 1915, when the much publicized lynching of Leo Frank, a Jew, in Georgia by a mob of White Southerners caused many Southern Jews to "become acutely conscious of the similarities and differences between themselves and Blacks." Some began feeling an increased sense of solidarity with Blacks, as the trial exposed widespread antisemitism in Georgia. On the other hand, the trial pitted Jews against Blacks because Frank's Jewish defense attorneys excluded Black jurors and exploited anti-Black racism by shifting the blame for the murder of Mary Phagan, a White girl, to Jim Conley, a Black janitor and witness against Frank. Frank's lead attorney Luther Rosser called Conley a "dirty, filthy, Black, drunken, lying nigger." This strategy made sense, as most Southern Jews were quite racist towards Blacks at the time and took advantage of their higher social status. Many historians since the late 20th century have concluded that Conley did murder Phagan.

Marcus Garvey (1887–1940) was an early promoter of pan-Africanism and African redemption and led the Universal Negro Improvement Association and African Communities League. His push to celebrate Africa as the original homeland of African Americans, led many Jews to compare Garvey to leaders of Zionism. An example of this was that Garvey wanted World War I peace negotiators to turn over former German colonies in southwest Africa to Blacks. In that period, Zionists were promoting a "return of Jews" after 2,000 years to the historic homeland of Israel, stressing self-determination for former colonies. At the same time, Garvey regularly criticized Jews in his columns in his newspaper Negro World for allegedly trying to destroy the Black population of America.

By the middle of the 20th century, many Southern Jews were supportive of the Civil Rights Movement. About 50 percent of the civil rights attorneys in the South during the 1960s were Jews, as were over 50 percent of the Whites who went to Mississippi in 1964 to challenge Jim Crow laws. These pro-Black Southern Jews tended to keep a low profile on "the race issue" in order to avoid attracting the attention of the anti-Black (and antisemitic) Ku Klux Klan. However, Klan groups exploited the issue of Black integration and Jewish involvement in the struggle in order to commit violently antisemitic hate crimes. As an example of this hatred, in one year alone, from November 1957 to October 1958, temples and other Jewish communal gatherings were bombed and desecrated in Atlanta, Nashville, Jacksonville, and Miami, and dynamite was found under synagogues in Birmingham, Charlotte, and Gastonia, North Carolina. Some rabbis received death threats, but there were no injuries following these outbursts of violence.

Shopkeeper and landlord relationships

Following the Civil War, Jewish shop-owners and landlords engaged in business with Black customers and tenants, often filling a need where non-Jewish, White business owners would not venture. This was true in most regions of the South, where Jews were often merchants in its small cities, as well as northern urban cities such as New York, where they settled in high numbers. Jewish shop-owners tended to be more civil than other Whites to Black customers, treating them with more dignity. Black people often had more immediate contact with white Jewish people compared to white Christians.

In 1903, Black historian W. E. B. Du Bois interpreted the role of Jews in the South as successors to the slave-barons:

Black novelist James Baldwin (1924–1987) grew up in Harlem in the years between the world wars. He wrote,

Baldwin wrote other accounts of Jews that were more sympathetic.

Martin Luther King Jr. suggested that some Black antisemitism arose from the tensions of landlord-tenant relations:

Entertainment

Jewish producers in the United States entertainment industry produced many works on Black subjects in the film industry, Broadway, and the music industry. Many portrayals of Black people were sympathetic, but historian Michael Rogin has discussed how some of the treatments could be considered exploitative.

Rogin also analyzes the instances when Jewish actors, such as Al Jolson, portrayed Blacks in Blackface. He suggests that these were deliberately racist portrayals but adds that they were also expressions of the culture at the time. Black people could not appear in leading roles in either the theatre or in movies: "Jewish blackface neither signified a distinctive Jewish racism nor produced a distinctive Black anti-Semitism".

Jews often interpreted Black culture in film, music, and plays. Historian Jeffrey Melnick argues that Jewish artists such as Irving Berlin and George Gershwin (composer of Porgy and Bess) created the myth that they were the proper interpreters of Black culture, "elbowing out 'real' Black Americans in the process." Despite evidence from Black musicians and critics that Jews in the music business played an important role in paving the way for mainstream acceptance of Black culture, Melnick concludes that, "while both Jews and African-Americans contributed to the rhetoric of musical affinity, the fruits of this labor belonged exclusively to the former."

Black academic Harold Cruse viewed the arts scene as a White-dominated misrepresentation of Black culture, epitomized by works like George Gershwin's opera Porgy and Bess.

Some Black people have criticized Jewish movie producers for portraying Black people in a racist manner. In 1990, at an NAACP convention in Los Angeles, Legrand Clegg, founder of the Coalition Against Black Exploitation, a pressure group that lobbied against negative screen images of African Americans, alleged: 

Professor Leonard Jeffries echoed those comments in a 1991 speech at the Empire State Plaza Black Arts & Cultural Festival in Albany, New York. Jeffries said that Jews controlled the film industry, using it to paint a negative stereotype of Blacks.

Jewish Americans are noted for playing a significant role in the development of Jazz. This is largely attributed to aligning through persecution, as Jews were not considered fully American or White throughout the 1920s and 30s. Willie "The Lion" Smith, Slim Gaillard, Cab Calloway, and other black musicians played Jewish and Jewish themed songs. Meanwhile, Jewish Jazz was an attempt to combine Jewish music and jazz into a new genre.

Civil rights movement

A 1934 ore-miner strike which lead to the killing of several Black miners was the catalyst for physicist Joseph Gelders' civil rights activism and labor organizing efforts. Gelders and his wife Esther started to host a weekly discussion group for students at the University of Alabama at Birmingham. He established an Alabama committee which worked on the Scottsboro Boys case. Due to his efforts, Gelders was kidnapped and assaulted by members of the Ku Klux Klan on September 23, 1936. Gelders and suffragist Lucy Randolph Mason established the Southern Conference for Human Welfare in 1938. In 1941, Gelders and activist Virginia Foster Durr led the creation of the National Committee to Abolish the Poll Tax.

Cooperation between Jewish and African-American organizations peaked after World War II—sometimes, it is called the "golden age" of the relationship. The leaders of each group jointly worked to launch a movement for racial equality in the United States, and Jews funded and led some national civil rights organizations. For Jewish publications, African-American Civil Rights leader W. E. B. Du Bois wrote testimonies and op-eds that decried the Nazi violence in Europe after he visited the eviscerated Warsaw Ghetto.

Historically, Black colleges and universities hired Jewish refugee professors who were not given comparable jobs in White institutions because wider American culture was antisemitic. This era of cooperation culminated in the passage of the Civil Rights Act of 1964, which outlawed racial and religious discrimination in schools and other public facilities, and the passage of the Voting Rights Act of 1965, which prohibited discriminatory voting practices and authorized the government to oversee and review state voting practices.

Historian Greenberg notes that one narrative of the relationship says: "It is significant that ... a disproportionate number of white civil rights activists were [Jewish] as well. Jewish agencies engaged with their African American counterparts in a more sustained and fundamental way than other white groups did largely because their constituents and their understanding of Jewish values and Jewish self-interest pushed them in that direction."

The extent of Jewish participation in the civil rights movement frequently correlated with their branch of Judaism: Reform Jews participated more frequently than Orthodox Jews. Many Reform Jews were guided by values which were reflected in the Reform branch's Pittsburgh Platform, which urged Jews to "participate in the great task of modern times, to solve, on the basis of justice and righteousness, the problems presented by the contrasts and evils of the present organization of society."

Religious leaders such as rabbis and ministers of Black Baptist churches frequently played key roles in the civil rights movement, including Abraham Joshua Heschel, who marched with Martin Luther King Jr. during the Selma to Montgomery marches. To commemorate this moment, 20 years later, representatives from the Coalition of Conscience, the King Center for Nonviolent Social Change, the American Jewish Committee, the Anti-Defamation League of B'nai B'rith (now the ADL) and the Atlanta Board of Education marched together again.

Sixteen Jewish leaders were arrested while they were heeding King's call to participate in the June 1964 Monson Motor Lodge protests in St. Augustine, Florida. It was the occasion of the largest mass arrest of rabbis in American history. Marc Schneier, President of the Foundation for Ethnic Understanding, wrote Shared Dreams: Martin Luther King Jr. and the Jewish Community (1999), recounting the historic relationship between African and Jewish Americans as a way to encourage a return to strong ties following years of animosity that reached its apex during the Crown Heights riot in Brooklyn, New York.

Northern and Western Jews frequently supported desegregation in their communities and schools, even at the risk of diluting the unity of their close-knit Jewish communities, which were frequently a critical component of Jewish life.

Murder of Jewish civil rights activists

The summer of 1964 was designated the Freedom Summer, and many Jews from the North and West traveled to the South to participate in a concentrated voter registration effort. Two Jewish activists, Andrew Goodman and Michael Schwerner, and one Black activist, James Chaney, were murdered by the Ku Klux Klan near Philadelphia, Mississippi, as a result of their participation. Their deaths were considered martyrdom by some, and as a result, Black-Jewish relations were temporarily strengthened.

In 1965, Martin Luther King Jr., said,

Questioning the "golden age"
Some recent scholarship suggests that the "golden age" (1955–1966) of the Black–Jewish relationship was not as ideal as it is often portrayed.

Philosopher and activist Cornel West said , "There was no golden age in which blacks and Jews were free of tension and friction". West said that this period of Black–Jewish cooperation is frequently downplayed by Black people and it is frequently romanticized by Jews: "It is downplayed by blacks because they focus on the astonishingly rapid entry of most Jews into the middle and upper middle classes during this brief period—an entry that has spawned... resentment from a quickly growing Black impoverished class. Jews, on the other hand, tend to romanticize this period because their present status as upper middle dogs and some top dogs in American society unsettles their historic self-image as progressives with a compassion for the underdog."

Historian Melanie Kaye/Kantrowitz points out that the number of non-Southern Jews who went to the southern states only numbered a few hundred, and she also points out that the "relationship was frequently out of touch, periodically at odds, with both sides failing to understand each other's point of view."

Political scientist Andrew Hacker wrote: "It is more than a little revealing that Whites who travelled south in 1964 referred to their sojourn as their 'Mississippi summer'. It is as if all the efforts of the local Blacks for voter registration and the desegregation of public facilities had not even existed until White help arrived... Of course, this was done with benign intentions, as if to say 'we have come in answer to your calls for assistance'. The problem was... the condescending tone... For Jewish liberals, the great memory of that summer has been the deaths of Andrew Goodman and Michael Schwerner and—almost as an afterthought—James Chaney. Indeed, Chaney's name tends to be listed last, as if the life he lost was only worth three fifths of the others."

Southern Jews in the civil rights movement

The vast majority of civil rights activism by American Jews was undertaken by Jews from the northern and western states. Jews from the southern states engaged in virtually no organized activity on behalf of civil rights. This lack of participation was puzzling to some northern Jews, due to the "inability of the northern Jewish leaders to see that Jews, before the battle for desegregation, were not generally victims in the South and that the racial caste system in the south situated Jews favorably in the Southern mind, or 'whitened' them." However, there were some southern Jews who participated in the civil rights movement as individuals.

Rabbi Jacob Rothschild was the rabbi of Atlanta's oldest and most prominent Jewish synagogue, The Hebrew Benevolent Congregation, also known as "the Temple", from 1946 until his death in 1973, where he distinguished himself as an outspoken proponent of civil rights.  Upon his arrival in Atlanta (after living in Pittsburgh for most of his life), Rabbi Rothschild was disturbed by the depth of the racial injustice which he witnessed and he resolved to make civil rights a focal point of his rabbinical career. He first broached the topic of civil rights in his 1947 Rosh Hashanah sermon but he remained mindful of his status as an outsider and during his first few years in Atlanta, he proceeded with caution in order to avoid alienating his supporters. By 1954, however, when the U.S. Supreme Court issued its Brown v. Board of Education decision, which called for the desegregation of public schools, race relations had become a recurring theme of his sermons, and Temple members had grown accustomed to his support of civil rights.

At the same time, he reached out to members of the local Christian clergy and he also became active in civic affairs, joining the Atlanta Council on Human Relations, the Georgia Council of Human Relations, the Southern Regional Council, the Urban League, and the National Conference of Christians and Jews. In order to promote cooperation with his Christian colleagues, Rothschild established the Institute for the Christian Clergy, an annual daylong event which was hosted by the Temple each February. Black ministers were always welcome at the Temple's interfaith events, and on other occasions, Rothschild invited prominent black leaders, such as Morehouse College president Benjamin Mays, to lead educational luncheons at the Temple, despite objections from some members of his congregation.

In 1957, when other southern cities were erupting in violent opposition to court-ordered school desegregation, eighty Atlanta ministers issued a statement in which they called for interracial negotiation, obedience to the law, and a peaceful resolution to the integration disputes that threatened Atlanta's moderate reputation. The Ministers' Manifesto, as the statement came to be known, marked an important turning point in Atlanta's race relations. Although the Manifesto's strong Christian language prevented Rothschild from signing it himself, the rabbi assisted in the drafting and conception of the 
statement, and he endorsed it in an article that ran separately in the Atlanta Journal and the Atlanta Constitution and later, it appeared in the Congressional Record.

While Rothschild's activism won admiration from some quarters of the city, it earned contempt from others. When fifty sticks of dynamite exploded at the Temple on October 12, 1958, many observers concluded that the rabbi's outspoken support of civil rights had made the synagogue a target of extremist violence. Because the bombing was condemned by elected officials, members of the press, and the vast majority of ordinary citizens, it resulted in a repudiation of extremism and a renewed commitment to racial moderation by members of official Atlanta.

Rather than withdraw from public life, Rothschild stepped up his activism after the bombing, regularly speaking in support of civil rights at public events throughout the city and throughout region, and assuming the vice presidency of the Atlanta Council on Human Relations. Members of his congregation followed Rothschild's lead, taking leadership positions in HOPE (Help Our Public Education) and OASIS (Organizations Assisting Schools in September), two influential organizations that helped ensure the peaceful integration of Atlanta's public schools in 1961.

During this period, Rothschild forged a close personal friendship with Martin Luther King Jr. After King received the Nobel Peace Prize in 1964, Rothschild assisted in the organizing of a city-sponsored banquet in King's honor, and during the banquet, he served as its master of ceremonies. After King's assassination in 1968, the combined clergy of Atlanta paid their respects to King by holding a memorial service at the Episcopal Cathedral of St. Philip, and Rothschild was selected to deliver the eulogy by his peers.

In the years after King's death, Rothschild's opposition to the more militant measures which were adopted by younger Black activists cost him much of the support which he once received from his African American counterparts in the civil rights movement. Despite his diminished stature in the Black community, Rothschild continued to candidly speak about social justice and civil rights on a regular basis until he died, after he suffered a heart attack, on December 31, 1973.

In recent decades, southern Jews have been more willing to speak out in support of civil rights, as was illustrated by the 1987 marches in Forsyth County, Georgia.

Black power movement
In 1966, the collaboration between Jews and Blacks started to unravel. Jews were increasingly transitioning to middle-class and upper-class status, creating a gap in relations between Jews and Black people. At the same time, many Black leaders, including some leaders of the Black power movement, became outspoken in their demands for greater equality, frequently criticizing Jews along with other White targets.

In 1966, the Student Nonviolent Coordinating Committee (SNCC) voted to exclude Whites from its leadership, a decision that resulted in the expulsion of several Jewish leaders.

In 1967, Black academic Harold Cruse attacked Jewish activism in his 1967 volume The Crisis of the Negro Intellectual in which he argued that Jews had become a problem for Blacks precisely because they had so identified with the Black struggle. Cruse insisted that Jewish involvement in interracial politics impeded the emergence of "Afro-American ethnic consciousness". For Cruse, as well as for other Black activists, the role of American Jews as political mediators between Blacks and Whites was "fraught with serious dangers to all concerned" and it must be "terminated by Negroes themselves."

Black Hebrew Israelites

Black Hebrew Israelites are groups of people, mostly of Black American ancestry who are mainly situated in the Americas and claim to be the descendants of the ancient Israelites. To varying degrees, Black Hebrews adhere to the religious beliefs and practices of both mainstream Judaism and mainstream Christianity, but they get most of their doctrines from Christian resources. They are generally not accepted as Jews by Orthodox, Conservative or Reform Jews, nor are they accepted as Jews by the wider Jewish community, due to their degree of divergence from mainstream Judaism, and their frequent expressions of hostility towards traditionally recognized Jews.

Many Black Hebrews consider themselves—and not Jews—to be the only authentic descendants of the ancient Israelites, claiming that Jews are simply imposters. Some groups identify themselves as Hebrew Israelites, other groups identify themselves as Black Hebrews, and other groups identify themselves as Jews. Dozens of Black Hebrew groups were founded in the United States during the late 19th and early 20th centuries.

In 2003, 1,200 Black Hebrew Israelites were found to be eligible for Israeli citizenship. Members of the community began to immigrate to Israel as early as 1992, when Israel's interior ministry began to grant Black Hebrew Israelites different levels of immigration status. Some Black Hebrew Israelites were granted full citizenship, while others were granted permanent resident status, and others were granted temporary resident status. In April 2021, A spokesman for the Israeli government announced Israel's plans to deport dozens of African Hebrews despite the fact that many members of the community had received permanent residency under arrangements with Israel. 51 members of the community were ordered to leave their homes by September 23, 2021. In October 2021, the Beersheba court district issued an interim injunction that effectively halted the deportations.

British filmmaker Louis Theroux documented the movement in his Weird Weekends series.

Labor movement

The labor movement was another area of the relationship that flourished before WWII, but it ended in conflict afterwards. In the early 20th century, one important area of cooperation was attempts to increase minority representation in the leadership of the United Automobile Workers (UAW). In 1943, Jews and Black people joined to request the creation of a new department within the UAW dedicated to minorities, but that request was refused by UAW leaders.

In the immediate post-World War II period, the Jewish Labor Committee (JLC), which was founded in February 1934 to oppose the rise of Nazism in Germany, formed approximately two dozen local committees to combat racial intolerance in the U.S and Canada. The JLC, which had local offices in a number of communities in North America, helped found the United Farm Workers and campaigned for the passage of California's Fair Employment Practices Act,  and provided staffing and support for the 1963 March on Washington for Jobs and Freedom led by Martin Luther King Jr., A. Philip Randolph and Bayard Rustin.

Beginning in early 1962, the NAACP's labor director Herbert Hill alleged that since the 1940s, the JLC had also defended the anti-Black discriminatory practices of unions in both the garment and building industries. Hill claimed that the JLC changed "a Black white conflict into a Black-Jewish conflict". He said that the JLC defended the Jewish leaders of the International Ladies' Garment Workers' Union (ILGWU) against charges of anti-Black racial discrimination, distorted the government's reports about discrimination, failed to tell union members the truth, and when union members complained, the JLC labeled them antisemites. Hill says that ILGWU leaders denounced Black members for demanding equal treatment and access to leadership positions.

The New York City teachers' strike of 1968 also signaled the decline of Black-Jewish relations: the Jewish president of the United Federation of Teachers, Albert Shanker, made statements that were seen by some as straining Black-Jewish relations because in them, he accused Black teachers of being antisemitic.

Criticism of Zionism

After Israel took over the West Bank and Gaza following the 1967 Six-Day War, some Black Americans supported the Palestinians and criticized Israel's actions; for example, they publicly supported the Palestinian leader Yasser Arafat and called for the destruction of the Jewish state. Some of them, such as Muhammad Ali and Malcolm X, also criticized the Zionist movement.

Immediately after the Six Day War, the editor of the Student Nonviolent Coordinating Committee's (SNCC) newsletter wrote an article which criticized Israel, asserted that the war was an effort to regain Palestinian land and asserted that during the 1948 Arab–Israeli War, "Zionists conquered the Arab homes and land through terror, force, and massacres". The publication of this article triggered a conflict between Jews and the SNCC, but Black SNCC leaders treated the war as a "test of their willingness to demonstrate the SNCC's break from its civil rights past".

The concerns of Black people continued to be expressed, and in 1993, the Black philosopher Cornel West wrote the following in Race Matters: "Jews will not comprehend what the symbolic predicament and literal plight of Palestinians in Israel means to Blacks.... Blacks often perceive the Jewish defense of the state of Israel as a second instance of naked group interest, and, again, an abandonment of substantive moral deliberation."

The support of Palestinians is frequently due to the consideration of them as people of color—Andrew Hacker writes: "The presence of Israel in the Middle East is perceived as thwarting the rightful status of people of color. Some Blacks view Israel as essentially a White and European power, supported from the outside, and occupying space that rightfully belongs to the original inhabitants of Palestine."

Martin Luther King Jr. criticized this position at the 68th Annual Rabbinical Assembly for Conservative Judaism, saying
On the Middle East crisis, we have had various responses. The responses of the so-called young militants does not represent the position of the vast majority of Negroes. There are some who are color consumed and see a kind of mystique in being colored, and anything non-colored is condemned. We do not follow that course in the Southern Christian Leadership Conference, and certainly most of the organizations in the civil rights movement do not follow that course."

Affirmative action
Many Black people have supported government and business affirmative action, while many Jews have not, preferring merit-based systems. Historians believe that this difference contributed to the decline of the Black-Jewish alliance in the 1970s, when Blacks began seeking ways to build on the civil rights legislation of the 1960s. As Blacks continued to face widespread discrimination and struggled to make progress in society, they began to develop an increasing militancy. Greenberg believes that this increased resentment and fear among Jews.

Herbert Hill's survey of affirmative-action lawsuits found that Jewish organizations have generally opposed affirmative-action programs. A widely publicized example of the Black-Jewish conflict arose in the 1978 affirmative action case of Regents of the University of California v. Bakke, when Black and Jewish organizations took opposing sides in the case of a White student who sued for admission, claiming that he was unfairly excluded by affirmative action programs.

Antisemitism among African Americans
Some leaders of the Black community have publicly made antisemitic comments, expressing antisemitic opinions that are held by a wider circle of some Blacks, accusing Jews of being over-aggressive in their business relations with black people, accusing Jews of being more loyal to Israel (and accusing Jews of being less loyal to the United States), alleging that Jews participated in the slave trade, and accusing Jews of economically oppressing black people. Some analysts attribute Black antisemitism to resentment or envy which is "directed at another underdog who has 'made it' in American society".

In 1935, during the Great Depression, the Black activist Sufi Abdul Hamid led boycotts against certain Harlem merchants and establishments (most of them were owned by Jewish proprietors) which he claimed discriminated against Blacks. In response to these activities, some Jews accused him of fomenting antisemitism.

In 1984, presidential candidate Jesse Jackson and former United Nations ambassador Andrew Young made antisemitic comments, which were widely publicized. These remarks were thought to have extended the era of African-American and Jewish distrust into the 1980s.

In 1991 in Brooklyn, a Black mob that was involved in the Crown Heights riot killed Yankel Rosenbaum, an Orthodox Jew, after a car that was driven by a Jew hit and killed a Black boy in the neighborhood. Some commentators believed that the unrest was related to antisemitism. The two ethnic groups live in close proximity to each other in this neighborhood, and the Orthodox Jewish community has been expanding.

During the 1990s, antisemitism in Black communities became widespread on college campuses, where some commentators made accusations about Jewish participation in the slave trade, with some commentators claiming that they had dominated it. Prof. Leonard Jeffries of the City College of New York was a proponent of this idea, but his conclusions have been disputed by major African-American historians of the slave trade, including David Brion Davis.

According to surveys that were first conducted by the Anti-Defamation League in 1964, a Jewish organization, African Americans are significantly more likely to hold antisemitic beliefs than White Americans are. There is a strong correlation between higher education levels and the rejection of antisemitic stereotypes among members of all races, but Black Americans with all educational levels are significantly more likely to be antisemitic than Whites with the same educational level are.

In a 1998 survey, Blacks (34% of them) were nearly four times as likely as Whites (9% of them) to give answers that identified them as belonging in the most antisemitic category (those blacks who agreed with at least 6 out of 11 statements that were potentially or clearly antisemitic). Among Blacks with no college education, 43% of them responded as the most antisemitic group (vs. 18% of the general population). This percentage fell to 27% among Blacks with some college education, and 18% among Blacks with a four-year college degree (vs. 5% for the general population).

Antisemitic expressions by high-profile African Americans 

Malcolm X held complex ideas about Jews. He admired the way they lived, and wanted the same for the black community. He informed audiences that Jews “control 90 percent of the businesses in every Negro community from the Atlantic to the Pacific.” He also said, “Only 6 million Jews were killed by Hitler. Don't let no Jew get up in your face and make you cry for him. One hundred million of us were kidnapped and brought to this country—100 million. Now everybody's getting wet-eyed over a handful of Jews . . . What about our hundred million? Besides, Jews, brought it on themselves.”

In 1988, rapper Professor Griff of Public Enemy gave interviews to UK magazines and during them, he made antisemitic remarks. In a 1988 issue of Melody Maker, he stated, "If the Palestinians took up arms, went into Israel and killed all the Jews, it'd be all right." However, there was little controversy until May 22, 1989, when Griffin was interviewed by The Washington Times, and during the interview, he stated that "Jews are responsible for all of the wickedness in the world," amongst other offensive ideas. The band found itself under intense scrutiny, and it fired Griffin as a result.

In 1995, Michael Jackson's song They Don't Care About Us contained racist and antisemitic content. The song's lyrics included, "Jew me, sue me, everybody do me/ Kick me, kike me, don't you black or white me." Film director Spike Lee defended Jackson's use of racially offensive words. In a recorded telephone call, Jackson said that Jews were "leeches".

In 2008, singer Erykah Badu performed in Tel Aviv, and during her performance,she talked about conspiracist Louis Farrakhan. She told the crowd, "Farrakhan is not an anti-Semite. He loves all people."

In a 2013 interview with Hardknock TV, rapper Scarface blamed Jewish people for the alleged demise of hip hop. He said: "I feel like we losing [hip hop]. I feel like the people that are in control of what hip hop does is so fucking white and so fucking Jewish until they don't give a fuck about what the culture and the craft and what it really is about."

Since 2012, writer Alice Walker has expressed appreciation for the works of the British conspiracy theorist David Icke. In 2013, she appeared on BBC Radio 4's Desert Island Discs, claiming that Icke's book Human Race Get Off Your Knees: The Lion Sleeps No More, which contains antisemitic conspiracy theories, would be the book she would take to a desert island. The book promotes the theory that the Earth is ruled by shapeshifting reptilian humanoids and "Rothschild Zionists". In 2017, Walker published a poem on her blog entitled "It Is Our (Frightful) Duty to Study The Talmud", where she reveals that her Jewish ex-husband had accused her of "appearing to sound antisemitic". In a 2018 book review with The New York Times, Walker was asked, "What books are on your nightstand?" She listed Icke's And the Truth Shall Set You Free, another book promoting an antisemitic conspiracy theory, drawing on The Protocols of the Elders of Zion and Holocaust denial. In 2022, Walker was disinvited from the (San Francisco) Bay Area Book Festival due to what the organizers referred to as her "endorsement of anti-Semitic conspiracy theorist David Icke."

In 2016, rapper Lupe Fiasco performed freestyle onstage. Lyrics included, "Artists gettin' robbed for their publishing / By dirty Jewish execs who think that it's alms from the covenant". He received widespread criticism on social media, which he fought back on. To push back at the accusations, he said, "I've walked inside the ovens of Auschwitz" and "I've studied the Hebrew bible". His song N.E.R.D. features the line, "Artists getting robbed for their publishing/By dirty Jewish execs who think that it's alms from the covenant."

In 2017, rapper Jay-Z saw criticism for his track The Story of OJ. Lyrics included, "You ever wonder why Jewish people own all the property in America? This is how they did it."

In 2018, basketball player LeBron James saw criticism for posting a selfie accompanied with rapper 21 Savage's song lyrics saying, "We getting that Jewish money, Everything is Kosher."

In 2019, rapper Kodak Black was arrested for weapons possession and sentenced to four years in federal prison. During his incarceration, he began to identify as a Hebrew Israelite after a priest who conducts prison ministry studied scripture with him. In an Instagram Live session, he stated, "Im a f*ckin jew. I'm more jew than you. You jewish, you converted."

In 2020, Nick Cannon was fired by ViacomCBS after making racist and antisemitic remarks during an episode of his podcast Cannon's Class with Professor Griff. Cannon endorsed conspiracy theories about Jewish control of finance, claimed that Jews had stolen the identity of "black people as the 'true Hebrews'", and cited Louis Farrakhan, who is labeled as an antisemite by the Southern Poverty Law Center and Anti-Defamation League. Cannon later apologized for his comments, stating that he felt "ashamed for my comments".

In 2020, rapper Jay Electronica sampled conspiracy theorist Louis Farrakhan on A Written Testimony. One track from the album includes a reference to the "Synagogue of Satan", a phrase Farrakhan often uses as an antisemitic slur. As a result, Electronica has been accused of antisemitism.

In 2020, entertainer Ice Cube was accused of a "long, disturbing history of anti-Semitism" in an article in the Daily Beast. In 2015, Ice Cube was sued for ordering a rabbi to be assaulted. During the assault, he allegedly expressed antisemitic slurs at the rabbi for wearing a yarmulke.

In 2020, grime musician Wiley posted a string of posts and videos describing Jews as "cowards" and "snakes". He alleged significant racism and exploitation from Jewish people towards black people (particularly in business and the music industry), and compared the power of the Jewish community to that of white supremacist group Ku Klux Klan. He also claimed that Jews write laws, own the police, run banks and run the world. His management ceased representing him and Wiley received a temporary ban from Twitter.

In 2020, American football player DeSean Jackson posted an Instagram story featuring a quote falsely attributed to Adolf Hitler, espousing Black Hebrew Israelite ideology, that read: "because the white Jews knows [sic] that the Negroes are the real Children of Israel and to keep Americas [sic] secret the Jews will blackmail America. They will extort America, their plan for world domination won't work if the Negroes know who they were". The post also read "Hitler was right."

In 2021, basketball player Kyrie Irving made his first tweet espousing Black Hebrew Israelite doctrine. In October 2022, Irving faced criticism for posting Hebrews to Negroes: Wake Up Black America, an antisemitic Black Hebrew Israelite documentary, onto his Twitter and Instagram accounts. The documentary denied the Holocaust, included quotes attributed to Adolf Hitler, and stated that Jews controlled the African slave trade and the media. At a press conference, Irving defended sharing the documentary saying: "I'm not going to stand down on anything I believe in. I'm only going to get stronger because I'm not alone. I have a whole army around me."

On January 31, 2022, Whoopi Goldberg drew widespread criticism for stating that the Holocaust was not based on race but "about man's inhumanity to man", telling her co-hosts: "This is white people doing it to white people, so y'all going to fight amongst yourselves." She apologized on Twitter later that day. She maintained that the Nazis' issue was with ethnicity and not race on The Late Show with Stephen Colbert that same day. Goldberg was subsequently suspended from The View for two weeks over the comments.

In October 2022, singer Kanye West made extensive antisemitic statements. West has publicly repeated Black Hebrew Israelite ideology.

On November 12, 2022, comedian Dave Chappelle hosted Saturday Night Live for the third time. His monologue received criticism on social media and in the news for supporting antisemitic tropes. In particular, he was criticised for comments which appeared to back the actions of Kyrie Irving.

On December 1, 2022, Kanye West praised Adolf Hitler on InfoWars, saying "every human being has something of value that they brought to the table, especially Hitler", "I love Jewish people but I also love Nazis", "There's a lot of things that I love about Hitler; a lot of things" (with heavy emphasis on 'a lot' and 'love'), "I like Hitler", and "I am a Nazi". He also stated that "we got to stop dissing the Nazis all the time", "the Jewish media has made us feel like the Nazis and Hitler have never offered anything of value to the world", and "my accounts have been frozen by the Jewish banks". When confronted for his antisemitism, West added that "I'm not on the whole Jew thing." West also denied the Holocaust and falsely claimed that it was "factually incorrect" that Hitler killed six million Jews.
Following the interview, West posted an image on Twitter of a Star of David with a swastika etched inside; a symbol that is associated with the Raëlian Movement. His Twitter account was then suspended immediately afterwards, with Twitter CEO Elon Musk stating that he had violated Twitter's rules against incitement to violence.

Joint stand taken against racism and antisemitism by high-profile African Americans and Jewish Americans

In December 2022, taking an active and joint stand against the increasing number of instances of racism and antisemitism in the US, New York City Mayor Eric Adams, Rev. Al Sharpton, the Vista Equity Partners CEO and Carnegie Hall Chairman Robert F. Smith, World Values Network founder and CEO Rabbi Shmuley Boteach, and Elisha Wiesel jointly hosted 15 Days of Light, celebrating Hanukkah and Kwanzaa in a unifying holiday ceremony at Carnegie Hall.   The speakers called for Americans to join them in a national display of unity to dispel the darkness of racism and antisemitism for the 15 nights of Hanukkah and Kwanzaa.  Sharpton said: "There is never a time more needed than now for Blacks and Jews to remember the struggle that we’ve gone through. You can't fight for anybody if you don't fight for everybody. I cannot fight for Black rights if I don't fight for Jewish rights ... because then it becomes a matter self-aggrandizement rather than fighting for humanity. It's easy for Blacks to stand up for racism. It's easy for Jews to stand up to antisemitism. But if you want to really be a leader, you got to speak as a Black against antisemitism and antisemites, and you got to speak as a Jew against racism." Smith said: "When we unify the souls of our two communities, we can usher in light to banish the darkness of racism, bigotry, and antisemitism."  Wiesel added: "The Wiesel family stands now and will always stand with the Black community against racism and the lingering economic effects of slavery and segregation in this country.  And we are so moved to hear leaders in the Black community like Mayor Adams, Rev Sharpton, and Rev Tillard speak out so strongly against antisemitism." Boteach commented: "highly committed Jewish leaders ... joined to fight racism and stand with our Black brothers and sisters against hate. This is the way it should be. Blacks and Jews united to promote human dignity and fight the haters."

Nation of Islam

The Nation of Islam, a black religious and political group, expressed several antisemitic pronouncements in the late 20th century. The group's founder, Elijah Muhammad, targeted whites in general, and he also asserted that whites—as well as Jews—are devils, implicated in the history of racism against blacks. However, he did not consider Jews to be any more corrupt or oppressive than other whites were.

In 1993, Nation of Islam spokesman Khalid Abdul Muhammad called Jews "bloodsuckers" in a public speech, leading to widespread public condemnation. The Nation of Islam's current leader, Louis Farrakhan, has made several remarks that the Anti-Defamation League and others consider antisemitic. He is alleged to have referred to Judaism as a "dirty religion" and he is also alleged to have called Adolf Hitler a "very great man"; Farrakhan denied these claims but a tape obtained by The New York Times supports the claim that he did and that he praised Hitler.

Elijah Muhammad claimed that blacks— not whites or Europeanized Jews— are the chosen people. Louis Farrakhan has also claimed that African Americans are the chosen people. In a 1985 speech, Farrakhan said "I have a problem with Jews ... because I am declaring to the world that they are not the chosen people of God. ... You, the black people of America and the Western Hemisphere [are]."

Nation of Islam identity Malcolm X has been widely accused of being antisemitic. His autobiography contains several antisemitic charges and caricatures of Jews. Alex Haley, the autobiography's co-author, had to rewrite some of the book in order to eliminate a number of negative statements about Jews in the manuscript. Malcolm X believed that the fabricated antisemitic text "Protocols of the Elders of Zion", was authentic and introduced it to NOI members, while blaming Jewish people for "perfecting the modern evil" of neo-colonialism. He was a leading figure in reshaping the black community's perception of The Holocaust, engaging in Holocaust trivialization and claiming that the Jews "brought it on themselves".

In 1961, Malcolm X spoke at a NOI rally alongside George Lincoln Rockwell, the head of the American Nazi Party. Rockwell claimed that there was overlap between Black nationalism and White supremacy. Even after his departure from the NOI and during the last months of his life, Malcolm X's statements about Jews continued to include antisemitic images of Jews as "bloodsucker[s]".

Alleged overrepresentation of Jews in the slave trade

The American Jewish population from the 1600s–1800s was extremely low, with few settling in the South. As such, the Jewish role in the American slave trade was minimal. Overall, Jews accounted for 1.25 per cent of Southern slave owners.

Of all the shipping ports in Colonial America, only in Newport, Rhode Island, did Jewish merchants play a significant part in the slave-trade.

During the 1990s, much of the Jewish-black conflict centered on allegations of antisemitism which were made against studies of Jewish involvement in the Atlantic slave trade and allegations that they were over-represented as prominent figures in it. Professor Leonard Jeffries stated in a 1991 speech that "rich Jews" financed the slave trade, citing the role of Jews in slave-trading centers such as Rhode Island, Brazil, the Caribbean, Curaçao, and Amsterdam. His comments drew widespread outrage and calls for his dismissal from his position.

As a source, Jeffries cited The Secret Relationship Between Blacks and Jews (1991), published by the Nation of Islam. That book alleges that Jews played a major role in the African slave trade, and it generated considerable controversy. Scholarly works were published which rebutted its charges. Mainstream scholars of slavery such as David Brion Davis concluded that Jews had little major or continuing impact on the history of New World slavery.

American historian Wim Kooster notes that "[i]n no period did Jews play a leading role as financiers, shipowners, or factors in the transatlantic or Caribbean slave trades. They possessed far fewer slaves than non-Jews in every British territory in North America and the Caribbean. Even when Jews in a handful of places owned slaves in proportions slightly above their representation among a town's families, such cases do not come close to corroborating the assertions of The Secret Relationship."

Tony Martin of Wellesley College included The Secret Relationship between Blacks and Jews in the reading list for his classes, leading to charges of antisemitism against him in 1993.

Henry Louis Gates Jr. of Harvard University called the book "the bible of new anti-Semitism" and added that "the book massively misinterprets the historical record, largely through a process of cunningly selective quotations of often reputable sources."

Anti-Black racism among Jews
The counterpoint to Black antisemitism is Jewish anti-Black racism. Some black customers and tenants felt that Jewish shopkeepers and landlords treated them unfairly because they were racists. Hacker quotes James Baldwin's comments about Jewish shopkeepers in Harlem in support of his racism claim.

Before the Civil War, Jewish slave ownership practices in the Southern United States were governed by regional practices, rather than Judaic law. Many Southern Jews held the view that Black people were subhumans fit only for slavery, which was the predominant view because it was also held by many of their non-Jewish Southern Christian neighbors. Jews conformed to the prevailing patterns of slave ownership in the South, and as a result, they were not significantly different from other slave owners in their treatment of slaves. Wealthy Jewish families in the American South generally preferred employing White servants rather than owning slaves. Jewish slave owners included Aaron Lopez, Francis Salvador, Judah Touro, and Haym Salomon.<ref>Friedman, Jews and the American Slave Trade;; pp xiii, 123-27.</ref> Jewish slave owners were mostly found in business or domestic settings, rather than plantations, so most of the slave ownership was in an urban context — running a business or working as domestic servants. Jewish slave owners freed their Black slaves at about the same rate as non-Jewish slave owners. Sometimes, Jewish slave owners bequeathed slaves to their children in their wills.

After the Civil War, most Southern Jews opposed the abolition of slavery, arguing it was "the only institution that could elevate the Negro from barbarism and develop the small amount of intellect with which he is endowed." While anti-Black racism was a core belief of the original Ku Klux Klan, antisemitism was not. Many prominent Southern Jews identified wholly with southern culture, resulting in examples of Jewish participation in the Klan. In 1896, an editorial in the newspaper The Jewish South observed that "Twenty-five years of education resulted in making the colored women more immoral and the men more trifling... Negroes are intellectually, morally and physically an inferior race- a fact none can deny." Ten years later, a Jewish member of the Carnegie Library Board in Atlanta, Georgia voted with the majority to reject a petition to admit Blacks to the library. These were not isolated incidents.

In the early 1970s, Atlanta's first Jewish mayor, Sam Massell, used blatant anti-Black rhetoric in his re-election bid for mayor against the city's first Black mayoral candidate Maynard Jackson. As a result, many progressive and college-educated whites in the city (including Atlanta's largest daily newspaper) publicly endorsed Jackson which caused Massell to lose his re-election campaign.

Hacker also quoted author Julius Lester, who was an African-American convert to Judaism, as writing: "Jews tend to be a little self-righteous about their liberal record, ... we realize that they were pitying us and wanted our gratitude, not the realization of the principles of justice and humanity... Blacks consider [Jews] paternalistic. Black people have destroyed the previous relationship which they had with the Jewish community, in which we were the victims of a kind of paternalism, which is only a benevolent racism."

In his 1992 essay "Blacks and Jews: The Uncivil War," historian Taylor Branch asserted that Jews had been "perpetrators of racial hate." He noted that 3,000 members of the African Hebrew Israelites of Jerusalem, founded in 1966 in Chicago, were denied citizenship as Jews when they moved en masse to Israel. The Americans claimed that they had the right of citizenship as Jews under the Israeli Law of Return. Under the law, the only people who are recognized as Jews are people who are born Jews (having a Jewish mother or having a Jewish maternal grandmother), those with Jewish ancestry (having a Jewish father or having a Jewish grandfather), and people who convert to Orthodox, Reform, or Conservative Judaism.

Branch believed that the rejection of the Chicago group was based on anti-Black sentiment among Israeli Jews.Branch, Taylor "Blacks and Jews: The Uncivil War", in Bridges and Boundaries: African Americans and American Jews (Salzman, Ed), 1992 Branch was criticized by Seth Forman, who said that his claims seemed baseless. He said that Israel had airlifted thousands of Ethiopian Jews to Israel in the early 1990s. A group of American civil rights activists which was led by Bayard Rustin investigated the 1966 case. They concluded that racism was not the cause of the Black Hebrews' rejection in Israel. They were considered a cult rather than a group of historic Jewish descendants.

See also

 African-American history
 African Americans in Israel
 African-American Jews
 Antisemitism in the United States#Antisemitism within the African-American community
 Antisemitism in the United States in the 21st century
 Geography of antisemitism#United States
 History of antisemitism in the United States
 List of antisemitic incidents in the United States
 Anti-Zionism#African-American community
 Black Hebrew Israelites
 Black Judaism
 Civil rights movement (1896–1954)
 History of the Jews in the United States
 Interminority racism in the United States
 Racism against African Americans
 Racism in Israel
 Racism in Jewish communities
 Racism in the United States

References

Notes

Footnotes

Works cited

 Adams, Maurianne, Strangers & neighbors: relations between Blacks & Jews in the United States, 2000.
 Bauman, Mark K. The quiet voices: southern rabbis and Black civil rights, 1880s to 1990s, 1997.
 Berman, Paul, Blacks and Jews: Alliances and Arguments', 1995.
 Cannato, Vincent The ungovernable City, 2002.
 Diner, Hasia R. In the almost promised land: American Jews and Blacks, 1915–1935 Dollinger, Mark, "African American-Jewish Relations" in Antisemitism: a historical encyclopedia of prejudice and persecution, Vol 1, 2005.
 Forman, Seth, Blacks in the Jewish Mind: A Crisis of Liberalism, 2000.
 Franklin, Vincent P., African Americans and Jews in the twentieth century: studies in convergence and conflict, 1998.
 Friedman, Murray, What Went Wrong?: The Creation & Collapse of the Black-Jewish Alliance, 1995.
 Friedman, Saul, Jews and the American Slave Trade, 1999.
 Greenberg, Cheryl, Troubling the waters: Black-Jewish relations in the American century, 2006. 
 Hacker, Andrew (1999) "Jewish Racism, Black anti-Semitism", in Strangers & neighbors: relations between Blacks & Jews in the United States, Maurianne Adams (Ed.). Univ of Massachusetts Press, 1999.
 Kaufman, Jonathon, Broken alliance: the turbulent times between Blacks and Jews in America, 1995
 
 
 Martin, Tony The Jewish Onslaught: Despatches from the Wellesley Battlefront, 1993
 Melnick, Jeffrey Paul, A Right to Sing the Blues: African Americans, Jews, and American Popular Song, 2001.
 Melnick, Jeffrey, Black-Jewish Relations on Trial: Leo Frank and Jim Conley in the New South, 2000.
 
 Nation of Islam, The Secret Relationship Between Blacks and Jews, 1991.
 
 
 Pollack, Eunice G, "African American Antisemitism", in Encyclopedia of American Jewish history, Volume 1 By Stephen Harlan Norwood.
 
 
 
 Salzman, Jack and West, Cornel, Struggles in the promised land: toward a history of Black-Jewish relations, 1997
 Salzman, Jack (Ed.) Bridges and Boundaries: African Americans and American Jews, 1992
 Shapiro, Edward, Crown Heights: Blacks, Jews, and the 1991 Brooklyn Riot, 2006.
 Webb, Clive, Fight Against Fear: Southern Jews and Black Civil Rights, 2003.
 Weisbord, Robert G., and Stein, Arthur Benjamin, Bittersweet encounter: the Afro-American and the American Jew, Negro Universities Press, 1970
 West, Cornel, Race Matters, 1993.

External links
 Green, Emma. "Why Do Black Activists Care About Palestine?" The Atlantic. August 18, 2016.
 Webb, Clive. "Counterblast: How the Atlanta Temple Bombing Strengthened the Civil Rights Cause". Southern Spaces''. June 22, 2009.

 
History of African-American civil rights
History of civil rights in the United States
Movements for civil rights
1950s in the United States
1960s in the United States